The Honpa Hongwanji Mission of Hawaii (Honpa Honganji Hawai Betsuin) is a district of the Nishi (West) Hongwanji branch of Jodo Shinshu Buddhism, a school of Mahayana Pure Land Buddhism.

History
Jodo Shinshu Buddhism was established in Hawaii as a result of the immigration of Japanese people to work the sugarcane plantations in Hawaii. The first Hongwanji temple in the Hawaiian islands was dedicated on March 3, 1889. In 1897, the Nishi Hongwanji in Kyoto, Japan began sending official ministers to establish temples for Japanese immigrants in Hawaii and the mainland United States. The first was Kenjun Miyamoto, who laid the groundwork for the ministry. Honi Satomi was the first priest, serving from 1898 until 1900, when he returned to Japan. Yemyo Imamura took over for Satomi in 1900, and served until his death in 1932.

Since these early days, 36 temples have been established across the Hawaiian Islands, including the Honpa Hongwanji Hawaii Betsuin and the Honpa Hongwanji Hilo Betsuin. The mission operates the Hongwanji Mission School and Pacific Buddhist Academy.
It is administered separately from the Buddhist Churches of America, the umbrella organization of Jodo Shinshu temples in the continental United States.

In 1976, insurance executive Paul Yamanaka went to Yoshiaki Fujitani, Bishop of the Mission, with the idea to create a program called "Living Treasures of Hawai'i" modeled after the Living National Treasures program of Japan. The purpose of the award is to recognize and honor persons who have demonstrated excellence and high standards of achievement in their particular fields of endeavor and have made significant contributions to humanity toward a more fraternal society. Any person can nominate an individual for the award. This program has honored more than 100 community members to date.

Locations

Headquarters of the Honpa Hongwanji Mission of Hawaii are located in Honolulu. The following is a list of the organization's affiliated temples. 

Honpa Hongwanji Hawaii Betsuin, Honolulu
Honpa Hongwanji Hilo Betsuin, Hilo
Pacific Buddhist Academy, Honolulu
Hongwanji Mission School, Honolulu
Buddhist Study Center, Honolulu

Oahu
Aiea Hongwanji Mission, Aiea
Ewa Hongwanji Mission, Ewa
Jikoen Hongwanji Mission, Honolulu
Windward Buddhist Temple (Kailua Hongwanji Mission), Kailua
Mililani Hongwanji Mission, Mililani
Moiliili Hongwanji Mission, Honolulu
Pearl City Hongwanji Mission, Pearl City
Wahiawa Hongwanji Mission, Wahiawa
Waialua Hongwanji Mission, Waialua
Waianae Hongwanji Mission, Waianae
Waipahu Hongwanji Mission, Waipahu

Hawaii (Big Island)
Honohina Hongwanji Mission, Ninole
Honokaa Hongwanji Mission, Honokaa
Honomu Hongwanji Mission, Honomu
Kamuela Hongwanji Mission, Kamuela
Kohala Hongwanji Mission, Kapaau
Kona Hongwanji Mission, Kealakekua
Naalehu Hongwanji Mission, Naalehu
Paauilo Hongwanji Mission, Paauilo
Pahala Hongwanji Mission, Pahala
Papaaloa Hongwanji Mission, Papaaloa
Papaikou Hongwanji Mission, Papaikou
Puna Hongwanji Mission, Keaau

Maui
Kahului Hongwanji Mission, Kahului
Lahaina Hongwanji Mission, Lahaina
Makawao Hongwanji Mission, Makawao
Wailuku Hongwanji Mission, Wailuku
Lanai Hongwanji Mission, Lanai City

Kauai
Hanapepe Hongwanji Mission, Hanapepe
Kapaa Hongwanji Mission, Kapaa
Lihue Hongwanji Mission, Lihue
Waimea Hongwanji Mission, Waimea

See also
Buddhist Churches of America
Jodo Shinshu Buddhist Temples of Canada
South America Hongwanji Mission
Byodo-In Temple (non-denominational), Kaneohe
Broken Ridge Buddhist Temple (Korean Buddhism), Honolulu
Daifukuji Soto Zen Mission (Zen Buddhism), Honalo
Hawaii Shingon Mission (Shingon Buddhism), Hilo
Hsu Yun Temple (Chinese Buddhism), Honolulu
Koyasan Shingon Mission of Hawaii (Shingon Buddhism), Hilo

References

External links
 
 

 
Shinshū Honganji-ha
Buddhism in Hawaii
Japanese-American culture in Hawaii
Religious organizations established in 1889
1889 establishments in Hawaii